Allens Rivulet is a rural residential locality in the local government area (LGA) of Kingborough in the Hobart LGA region of Tasmania. The 2021 census recorded a population of 506 for Allens Rivulet.

History 
Allens Rivulet was gazetted as a locality in 1971.

Geography
Allens Rivulet (the stream) flows through from west to north-east. Most of the boundaries are survey lines.

Road infrastructure 
Route C622 (Sandfly Road) passes to the north. Access is provided by Allens Rivulet Road.

References

Towns in Tasmania
Localities of Kingborough Council